Stephania Bell (born May 20, 1966) is an American physical therapist who has become an author, as well as both on-air and online sports commentator at ESPN where she serves as an American football injury analyst.

Career
Bell formerly served as an injury analyst for KFFL, RotoWire and XM Radio. Hired in 2007, she actively blogs National Football League injury analysis for ESPN where she is a regular columnist. Bell complements on-air journalists with analysis of breaking news. She serves as a co-host of Fantasy Focus on ESPN Radio and an analyst for SportsNation on ESPN.com. She co-authored The Clinical Orthopedic Assessment Guide. Bell is a board-certified orthopedic clinical specialist and a certified strength and conditioning specialist. Since September 2008, Bell has had a residence in Connecticut near the ESPN studios. Bell is a member of the American Physical Therapy Association, and her ESPN blogs are cross-posted on their website.

At the suggestion of a friend she began blogging about football injuries. Her fantasy league commissioner advised her that her expertise might be marketable. Although pro teams are somewhat vague about players' injuries, Bell uses her experience to review videos of players' injuries, check their injury histories, and determine their training activities. Then in consultation with orthopedic surgeons she produces educated predictions about future player activity. In addition to commenting on NFL athletes, Bell has blogged about the injuries of star athletes in other sports such as Tiger Woods and Alex Rodriguez.

Background
Bell is from San Francisco, California, and she graduated from The Madeira School which is located in McLean, Virginia although she claims Mountain View, California as her home town. Bell earned her A.B. from Princeton University in 1987, where as a French major her senior thesis was about La Comédie humaine by Honoré de Balzac.  At Princeton, she worked in the athletic training department. She also earned a Master of Science in physical therapy from the University of Miami in 1991. She held a teaching position at the University of Kansas for five years.

Notes

External links
Stephania Bell ESPN search results
Stephania Bell Sportsnation chat
Stephania Bell Fantasy blog

1966 births
American women bloggers
American bloggers
American sports journalists
American sports radio personalities
American television sports announcers
People from Mountain View, California
American physiotherapists
Princeton University alumni
University of Kansas faculty
Leonard M. Miller School of Medicine alumni
Living people
Madeira School alumni
American women non-fiction writers
21st-century American non-fiction writers
American women academics
21st-century American women writers